The Luna Lodge is a historic motel on Central Avenue (former U.S. Route 66) in Albuquerque, New Mexico, which is notable as one of the best-preserved Route 66 era motels remaining in the city. The motel eventually closed and fell into disrepair, but was restored and converted to low-income housing in 2013. The property was added to the New Mexico State Register of Cultural Properties and the National Register of Historic Places in 1998.

The motel consists of three buildings arranged in a narrow U shape around a central parking lot, with 28 rooms in total. The building on the west side has a two-story portion at the front, containing the office on the ground floor and the manager's residence above. The remainder of the motel is one story. The eastern building had a small cafe at the front. The architecture is southwestern vernacular with some Streamline Moderne elements including the rounded front office.

References

External links

Historic American Engineering Record in New Mexico
Hotels in Albuquerque, New Mexico
Hotel buildings on the National Register of Historic Places in New Mexico
New Mexico State Register of Cultural Properties
National Register of Historic Places in Albuquerque, New Mexico
Hotel buildings completed in 1949
Motels in the United States
U.S. Route 66 in New Mexico
Pueblo Revival architecture in Albuquerque, New Mexico